was a Japanese magazine published by MediaWorks centered on publishing light novels aimed at a young adult male readership. The first issue was released on December 18, 1998, and for the first eight issues was published quarterly; after this, it was published bimonthly. The magazine was discontinued in October 2007, and was succeeded by Dengeki Bunko Magazine in December 2007.

List of serialized titles
9S
Aruhi, Bakudan ga Ochide Kite
Ballad of a Shinigami
Bludgeoning Angel Dokuro-Chan
Cheerful Charmer Momo
E.G. Combat
Hanbun no Tsuki ga Noboru Sora
Inside World
Inukami!
Iriya no Sora, UFO no Natsu
Kino's Journey
Mamoru-kun ni Megami no Shukufuku wo!
Missing:Kamikakushi
Nogizaka Haruka no Himitsu
Shakugan no Shana
Tensō no Shita no Bashireisu
Thunder Girl!
Toradora!
Toradora Spin-off!
Watashitachi no Tamura-kun

External links
Dengeki hp's official website 
MediaWorks' Dengeki hp page 

1998 establishments in Japan
2007 disestablishments in Japan
Bi-monthly manga magazines published in Japan
Defunct magazines published in Japan
Light novel magazines
Magazines established in 1998
Magazines disestablished in 2007
Magazines published in Tokyo
MediaWorks magazines
Quarterly manga magazines published in Japan